Mueang Chi is a village and tambon (subdistrict) of Mueang Lamphun District, in Lamphun Province, Thailand. In 2005 it had a population of 9298 people. The tambon contains 14 villages.

References

Tambon of Lamphun province
Populated places in Lamphun province